Wrobleski is a surname. Notable people with the surname include:

Ann B. Wrobleski (born 1952), American lobbyist
Craig Wrobleski, Canadian cinematographer

English-language surnames